"Take Away" is a song by American rapper Missy Elliott. It was written by Elliott and Timbaland for her third studio album, Miss E... So Addictive (2001), while production was helmed by the latter, with Elliott and Craig Brockman served as co-producers. The downtempo track features guest vocals from R&B singer Ginuwine. While the album version of "Take Away" credits background vocals by 702 member, Kameelah Williams, the single version replaces Williams's vocals with then-newcomer, Elliott's former protégée Tweet.

Released as the album's third single, it reached the top 20 on the US Hot R&B/Hip-Hop Songs chart but was less successful than Elliott's previous singles "Get Your Freak On" and "One Minute Man." The accompanying music video was dedicated to Elliott's close friend Aaliyah, who was killed in a plane crash in August 2001. The remainder of the music video features a snippet of Elliott's single, "4 My People", which served as an aptly–upbeat dedication to the victims of the 9/11 attacks and citizens of the United States.

Critical reception
Rolling Stone felt that the song was "awesome." Pitchfork found that "Take Away" attempts "to update early Prince ballads, and instead reveals how those slow R&B jams depended on The Artist's histrionics to carry the song. And despite having already proven herself more than capable of similar theatricalities, she relies on played-out vocoder, and irrationally allows Ginuwine to dumb things down with "sensitive" crooning." Stephen Dalton from NME called "Take Away" the "dullest cut off Miss E… So Addictive, a sugary R&B ballad with no subversive sexual sermons, no chop-socky speedbeats, no dazzling verbal somersaults – just a straight declaration of love which transcends mere earthly riches. With Ginuwine and newcomer Charlene "Tweet" Keys shouldering the bulk of the vocals, Missy the hyperkinetic maverick is cooking on a low heat here." Exclaim! critic Cam Lindsay found that the song "disappoints, with Ginuwine taking over the spotlight, and is a throwaway slow jam that seems to steer away from Missy's talents."

Chart performance
"Take Away" was released via radio airplay as the third single from Miss E... So Addictive on October 18, 2001 and began charting as an album cut. Soon as it picked up heavier airplay and debuted on the US Billboard Hot R&B/Hip-Hop Singles & Tracks at number 84, the song was physically released in the United States on November 5, 2001, and in international regions on January 29, 2002.

Music video
Directed by Dave Meyers, the video begins with a message from Missy Elliott:

Elliott is then shown singing her verses in a Fantasy Kingdom–themed palace; decorated with angelic statues and flowers. Tweet is then spotted singing the chorus with Elliott while holding an umbrella under showering flower petals. The following scene then shows Ginuwine singing his verses in two differing locations—one being a rocky cave; and the other being steps of the palace. During his verses, Ginuwine along with Elliott glance at the sight of waterfalls where pictures of Aaliyah are reflecting from the water. Tweet is then shown singing the chorus with Elliott, while playing the harp as people dressed in white begin to dance. The video then transitions to Elliott performing "4 My People" with an American crowd in an upbeat dedication to the 9/11 victims.

The video then ends with a message from Elliott:

Cover versions
On September 29, 2014, the album version of the song was sampled by Elliott's protégée Sharaya J for her single, "Takin' It No More".

Track listings

Notes
 signifies a co-producer
 signifies a remix producer

Credits and personnel

Craig Brockman – co-producer
Jimmy Douglass – engineer, mixing
Missy Elliott – co-producer, vocals, writer
Ginuwine – vocals
Jesse Gorman – assistant enginee
Bernie Grundman – mastering

Steve Penny – assistant engineer
Grayson Sumby – assistant engineer
Timbaland – mixing, producer, writer
Tweet – vocals
Melah Williams – ad libs

Charts

Release history

References 

2001 singles
2001 songs
Elektra Records singles
Ginuwine songs
Hip hop soul songs
Missy Elliott songs
Song recordings produced by Timbaland
Songs written by Missy Elliott
Songs written by Timbaland
Tweet (singer) songs
Contemporary R&B ballads
2000s ballads